In mathematics, the Brown measure of an operator in a finite factor is a probability measure on the complex plane which may be viewed as an analog of the spectral counting measure (based on algebraic multiplicity) of matrices.

It is named after Lawrence G. Brown.

Definition

Let  be a finite factor with the canonical normalized trace  and let  be the identity operator. For every operator  the function

is a subharmonic function and its Laplacian in the distributional sense is a probability measure on 

which is called the Brown measure of  Here the Laplace operator  is complex. 

The subharmonic function can also be written in terms of the Fuglede−Kadison determinant  as follows

See also

References

 . Geometric methods in operator algebras (Kyoto, 1983).

 .

Mathematical terminology